Mahmoud Younis (April 12, 1911 – April 18, 1976) was an engineer of the Suez Canal nationalization on July 26, 1956. He served as Chairman of the Suez Canal Authority (July 10, 1957 – October 10, 1965). He also served as the head of engineers' syndicate during the rule of Gamal Abdel Nasser.

References

1911 births
1976 deaths
People of the Suez Crisis
Engineers from Cairo
20th-century Egyptian engineers
Electricity and Energy ministers of Egypt
Transport ministers of Egypt